Walter Jermaine Harris (born June 10, 1983) is an American mixed martial artist currently competing in the Heavyweight division of the Ultimate Fighting Championship. A professional since 2011, Harris has also formerly competed for Titan FC.

Background
Before entering mixed martial arts in 2010, Harris was a basketball player at Jacksonville State University

Mixed martial arts career

Early career
Harris competed as an amateur from 2009–2010, compiling a record of 4–1. He made his professional debut on March 15, 2011, when he faced Justin Thornton at HEF: Hess Extreme Fighting. He won via first-round TKO, just sixteen seconds into the first round. Following this, Harris compiled a record of 6–1, with wins over Tony Melton and UFC veteran Anthony Hamilton, before signing with UFC in the fall of 2013.

Ultimate Fighting Championship
On September 19, 2013, it was announced that Harris had signed with the UFC, and he faced fellow newcomer Jared Rosholt at The Ultimate Fighter 18 Finale on November 30, 2013. Despite dropping Rosholt in the first round, Rosholt rallied back and Harris lost the fight via unanimous decision.

In his second fight with the promotion, Harris faced Nikita Krylov at UFC on Fox 10 on January 25, 2014. Though he was the considerable favorite coming into the bout, Harris was staggered by a head kick from Krylov, and after follow-up strikes on the ground from Krylov, he lost the bout via TKO, just 25 seconds into the first round. After dropping to 0–2 in the UFC, Harris was subsequently released from the promotion.

Titan Fighting Championship
Following his UFC release, Harris signed with Florida based promotion Titan FC. He faced D.J. Linderman at Titan FC 28 on May 16, 2014. He won the fight via first-round knockout. He was expected to face Dave Herman at Titan FC 30 on September 26, 2014. However, Harris pulled out of the bout due to a back injury and the fight was postponed.

The bout with Herman was rescheduled and was expected to take place on December 19, 2014. However, Harris resigned with the UFC, and he was replaced by Jon Madsen.

Return to UFC
After Daniel Omielańczuk was forced to pull out of his bout with Soa Palelei due to a thumb injury, Harris resigned with UFC and faced Palelei at UFC Fight Night 55 on November 7, 2014. He lost the fight via second-round TKO.

Harris faced promotional newcomer Cody East on April 23, 2016, at UFC 197. He won the fight via TKO in the first round.

Harris next faced Shamil Abdurakhimov on October 1, 2016, at UFC Fight Night 96. He lost the fight via split decision.

Harris faced Chase Sherman on January 15, 2017, at UFC Fight Night 103. He won the fight by knockout in the second round.

Harris made his next appearance against Cyril Asker on June 17, 2017, at UFC Fight Night 111. He won the fight early in the first round via TKO due to a combination of elbows and punches.

Harris was expected to face Mark Godbeer on October 7, 2017, at UFC 216 before a fight-day injury to Derrick Lewis took him out of his scheduled fight with Fabrício Werdum. As a result, Harris moved on to face Werdum, and Godbeer was pulled from the event. Harris lost the fight via submission in the first round.

The bout with Godbeer was quickly rescheduled and took place on November 4, 2017, at UFC 217. Harris lost the bout by disqualification after Harris hit Godbeer with a head kick following the referee calling a time out due to a groin strike.

Harris faced Daniel Spitz on June 1, 2018, at UFC Fight Night 131. He won the fight via knock out in the second round.

Harris faced Andrei Arlovski on December 29, 2018, at UFC 232. He won the fight via split decision. It was reported on January 26, 2019, that Harris tested positive for LGD4033, and selective androgen receptor modulators (SARMs) like ostarine, and he was temporarily suspended by California State Athletic Commission (CSAC). In February, Harris was suspended for four months and fined $4,000. The fight result was overturned to a no contest. Per the CSAC, Harris was able to prove the positive test resulted from a tainted supplement and the commission does not believe he was an intentional doper, hence the shorter suspension.

Harris was expected to face Alexey Oleynik on May 4, 2019, at UFC Fight Night 151. However, on April 3, 2019, it was announced that Oleinik would face Alistair Overeem at UFC Fight Night 149 after Alexander Volkov withdrew from the event. He was replaced by Sergey Spivak. Harris won the fight via TKO in the first round. This fight earned Harris his first Performance of the Night bonus award.

The bout between Harris and Oleynik was rescheduled and took place on July 20, 2019, at UFC on ESPN 4. Harris won the fight via knockout just 12 seconds into the first round. This win earned Harris his second consecutive Performance of the Night bonus.

Harris was expected to face Alistair Overeem on December 7, 2019, at UFC on ESPN 7. However, Harris pulled out on November 1, 2019 due to the ongoing search for his missing step-daughter.

Harris was expected to face Alistair Overeem on April 11, 2020 at UFC Fight Night: Overeem vs. Harris. The pairing was previously scheduled to headline UFC on ESPN 7 in December 2019. Due to the COVID-19 pandemic, the event was eventually postponed. The match was rescheduled to May 16, 2020 at UFC on ESPN: Overeem vs. Harris. Despite hurting, and almost finishing Overeem in the first round, Harris went on to lose via second-round TKO.

Harris faced Alexander Volkov on October 24, 2020 at UFC 254.  He lost the fight via technical knockout in round two.

Harris faced Marcin Tybura on June 5, 2021 at UFC Fight Night: Rozenstruik vs. Sakai. He lost the fight via TKO in round one.

Harris was scheduled to face Tai Tuivasa on October 30, 2021 at UFC 267. However, Harris pulled out of the bout due to unknown reasons.

Politics 
Harris ran for a city council seat in Homewood, Alabama in 2020 but finished 3rd in the race with 24 percent of the vote.

Personal life
Harris worked as a furniture mover and also worked for UPS prior to becoming an MMA fighter. Harris is married to Angela Haley-Harris, they have four children. They are currently living in Homewood, Alabama where their children attend school.

Murder of stepdaughter
At the end of October 2019, news surfaced that Harris's stepdaughter, Aniah Blanchard, was reported missing on October 24, 2019. Soon after, Auburn police revealed that after finding evidence from Blanchard's vehicle, they suspected foul play regarding the disappearance. Subsequently, Alabama Governor Kay Ivey set up a reward of $5,000 for information leading to the arrest and conviction of the perpetrator, which was matched by an anonymous donor. Additionally, the UFC President Dana White and UFC Light Heavyweight Champion Jon Jones upped the ante by contributing $25,000 per person for the information. The reward sum exceeded $100,000.

On November 6, 2019, the Auburn police department released surveillance footage from an Auburn convenience store, presenting the person suspected in the disappearance, later identified as Ibraheem Yazeed, a repeat offender. On November 8, 2019, Yazeed was captured as an out-of-state fugitive in Escambia County, Florida and was extradited to Auburn. On November 20, 2019, Yazeed was charged with first-degree kidnapping in an Alabama court, and remains in jail without bond. On November 25, 2019 an Alabama district attorney announced that they had found the remains of a girl they believe to be Aniah Blanchard in neighboring Macon County. Blanchard's remains were identified on November 27, 2019. In late November 2019, two additional suspects, Antwain Fisher and David Lee Johnson Jr., were arrested and charged with first-degree kidnapping and hindering prosecution, respectively. In December however, Fisher's charges were dropped with prejudice in Lee county. On November 28, 2019, police reports confirmed that the body found was indeed Harris's step daughter and an autopsy confirmed that Blanchard was killed by a gunshot wound. At the same time, the district attorney announced that capital murder charges were filed against Yazeed. In late 2022, Yazeed was indicted with three counts of capital murder and could face death penalty or life sentence without parole for each, should he be convicted.

Championships and accomplishments

Mixed martial arts
Ultimate Fighting Championship
Performance of the Night (Two times) 
Amateur Boxing
Golden Gloves Championship (Alabama)
Golden Gloves Championship (Georgia)

Mixed martial arts record

|-
|Loss
|align=center|13–10 (1)
|Marcin Tybura
|TKO (punches)
|UFC Fight Night: Rozenstruik vs. Sakai
|
|align=center|1
|align=center|4:06
|Las Vegas, Nevada, United States
|
|-
|Loss
|align=center|13–9 (1)
|Alexander Volkov
|TKO (body kick and punches)
|UFC 254
|
|align=center|2
|align=center|1:15
|Abu Dhabi, United Arab Emirates
|
|-
| Loss
|align=center|13–8 (1)
|Alistair Overeem
|TKO (punches)
|UFC on ESPN: Overeem vs. Harris
|
|align=center|2
|align=center|3:00
|Jacksonville, Florida, United States
|
|-
|Win
|align=center|13–7 (1)
|Alexey Oleynik
|KO (knee and punches)
|UFC on ESPN: dos Anjos vs. Edwards 
|
|align=center|1
|align=center|0:12
|San Antonio, Texas, United States
|
|-
|Win
|align=center|12–7 (1)
|Sergey Spivak
|TKO (punches)
|UFC Fight Night: Iaquinta vs. Cowboy 
|
|align=center|1
|align=center|0:50
|Ottawa, Ontario, Canada
|
|-
|NC
|align=center|11–7 (1)
|Andrei Arlovski
|NC (overturned by CSAC)
|UFC 232
|
|align=center|3
|align=center|5:00
|Inglewood, California, United States
|
|-
|Win
|align=center|11–7
|Daniel Spitz
|KO (punches)
|UFC Fight Night: Rivera vs. Moraes
|
|align=center|2
|align=center|4:59
|Utica, New York, United States
|
|-
|Loss
|align=center|10–7
|Mark Godbeer
|DQ (illegal kick)
|UFC 217
|
|align=center|1
|align=center|4:29
|New York City, New York, United States
|
|-
|Loss
|align=center|10–6
|Fabrício Werdum
|Submission (armbar)
|UFC 216
|
|align=center|1
|align=center|1:05
|Las Vegas, Nevada, United States
|
|-
|Win
|align=center|10–5
|Cyril Asker
|TKO (punches and elbows)
|UFC Fight Night: Holm vs. Correia
|
|align=center|1
|align=center|1:44
|Kallang, Singapore
|
|-
|Win
|align=center|9–5
|Chase Sherman
|KO (knee and punches)
|UFC Fight Night: Rodríguez vs. Penn
|
|align=center|2
|align=center|2:41
|Phoenix, Arizona, United States
|
|-
|Loss
|align=center|8–5
|Shamil Abdurakhimov
|Decision (split)
|UFC Fight Night: Lineker vs. Dodson
|
|align=center| 3
|align=center| 5:00
|Portland, Oregon, United States
|
|-
|Win
|align=center|8–4
|Cody East
|TKO (punches)
|UFC 197
|
|align=center|1
|align=center|4:18
|Las Vegas, Nevada, United States
|
|-
| Loss
| align=center| 7–4
| Soa Palelei
| TKO (punches)
| UFC Fight Night: Rockhold vs. Bisping
| 
| align=center|2
| align=center|4:49
| Sydney, Australia
|
|-
| Win
| align=center| 7–3
| D.J. Linderman
| KO (punches)
| Titan FC 28
| 
| align=center|1
| align=center|4:12
| Newkirk, Oklahoma, United States
|
|-
| Loss
| align=center| 6–3
| Nikita Krylov
| TKO (head kick and punches)
| UFC on Fox: Henderson vs. Thomson
| 
| align=center|1
| align=center|0:25
| Chicago, Illinois, United States
|
|-
| Loss
| align=center| 6–2
| Jared Rosholt
| Decision (unanimous)
| The Ultimate Fighter: Team Rousey vs. Team Tate Finale
| 
| align=center|3
| align=center|5:00
| Las Vegas, Nevada, United States
|
|-
| Win
| align=center| 6–1
| Tony Melton
| TKO (punches)
| Strike Hard Productions 24
| 
| align=center| 1
| align=center| 2:00
| Birmingham, Alabama, United States
|
|-
| Win
| align=center| 5–1
| Josh Robertson
| TKO (punches)
| Strike Hard Productions 20
| 
| align=center| 1
| align=center| 1:06
| Birmingham, Alabama, United States
|
|-
| Win
| align=center| 4–1
| Anthony Hamilton
| KO (punches)
| Superior Cage Combat 4: Grove vs. Silva
| 
| align=center| 1
| align=center| 1:15
| Las Vegas, Nevada, United States
|
|-
| Win
| align=center| 3–1
| Cedric James
| KO (punches)
| Fight Time 7: The Return
| 
| align=center| 1
| align=center| 0:22
| Fort Lauderdale, Florida, United States
|
|-
| Win
| align=center| 2–1
| Wes Little
| KO (punch)
| Fight Force International: Blood & Sand 9
| 
| align=center| 1
| align=center| 1:54
| Biloxi, Mississippi, United States
|
|-
| Loss
| align=center| 1–1
| Chris Barnett
| Decision (unanimous)
| World Extreme Fighting 46
| 
| align=center| 3
| align=center| 5:00
| Orlando, Florida, United States
|
|-
| Win
| align=center| 1–0
| Justin Thornton
| TKO (punches)
| Hess Extreme Fighting
| 
| align=center| 1
| align=center| 0:16
| Panama City Beach, Florida, United States
|

See also
 List of current UFC fighters
 List of male mixed martial artists

References

External links
 
 

1983 births
Living people
American male mixed martial artists
American sportspeople in doping cases
Doping cases in mixed martial arts
Heavyweight mixed martial artists
Mixed martial artists utilizing boxing
Sportspeople from Birmingham, Alabama
Mixed martial artists from Alabama
Jacksonville State Gamecocks men's basketball players
People from Coconut Creek, Florida
American men's basketball players
Ultimate Fighting Championship male fighters
American male boxers